Süreyya may refer to:

Şevket Süreyya Aydemir (1897–1976), Turkish intellectual, and a founder of the journal Kadro
Süreyya Ağaoğlu (1903–1989), Turkish writer, jurist, and the first female lawyer in Turkish history
Süreyya Ayhan (born 1978), middle-distance track runner and European record holder
Süreyyya Evren (born 1972), writer working on literature, contemporary art, and radical politics
Süreyya Opera House, opera hall in Kadıköy district of Istanbul, Turkey
Süreyya Serdengeçti (born 1952), Turkish economist and former Governor of the Central Bank of Turkey
Süreyya (film), a 1972 film

Turkish unisex given names